

cm
CMV-IGIV

co
Co-Gesic
Co-Lav
Co-Pyronil 2 Pulvules

coa-cog
CoActifed
Coactin
Cobal
Cobalasine Injection
cobamamide (INN)
Cobavite
Cobex
cobicistat (INN)
cobiprostone (USAN, INN)
Cobolin-M
cocaine
cocarboxylase (INN)
codactide (INN)
Codafed
Codamine
codeine
Codeprex
Codiclear DH
Codimal-L.A. 12
codoxime (INN)
Codoxy
Codrix
cofisatin (INN)
cogazocine (INN)
Cogentin
Cognex

col
Col-Probenecid

cola-colt
Colace
Colazal
ColBenemid
Cold Capsule V
Coldlac-LA
Coldloc
colecalciferol (INN)
coleneuramide (USAN, INN)
colesevelam (INN)
Colestid
colestilan (INN)
colestipol (INN)
colestolone (INN)
colestyramine (INN)
colextran (INN)
colfenamate (INN)
colforsin (INN)
colfosceril palmitate (INN)
Colgate Total
colimecycline (INN)
colistimethate sodium (INN)
colistin (INN)
collagenase clostridium histolyticum (USAN)
Colocort
Colonaid
Colovage
colterol (INN)

coly
Coly-Mycin M
Coly-Mycin S
Colyte

com-con
Combantrin
Combipatch
Combipres
Combivent
Combivir
comfilcon A (USAN)
Comfort Tears Solution
Comhist
Commit Lozenge
Compazine
Compound 65
compound insulin zinc suspension (INN)
compound solution of sodium chloride (INN)
compound solution of sodium lactate (INN)
Compro
Comtan
Comtrex
Comvax
conatumumab (USAN, INN)
conbercept (INN)
Concentraid
Conceptrol
Concerta
condoliase (INN)
Condyline
Condylox
conessine (INN)
conestat alfa (INN)
Congess Jr.
Congess Sr.
Congest
Congestac
Congestant D
conivaptan (INN)
conorfone (INN)
Conray
Constant-T Tablet
Constilac
Constulose
Contac 12 Hour
Contac
Controloc
Contuss
contusugene ladenovec (USAN, INN)

cop
Copaxone
Copegus
Cophene-B
Copper T Model TCU 380a

cor
Cor-Oticin

corb-cors
corbadrine (INN)
Cordarone
Cordran-N
Cordran
Coreg
Corgard
Corgonject
Coricidin
corifollitropin alfa (INN)
Corlopam
Cormax
cormetasone (INN)
Corphed
Corsym

cort-corz
Cort-Dome
CortaGel
Cortalone
Cortan
Cortef
Cortenema
Corticaine
corticorelin (INN)
corticotropin zinc hydroxide (INN)
corticotropin (INN)
Cortifoam
Cortimyxin
cortisone (INN)
Cortisporin
cortisuzol (INN)
cortivazol (INN)
Cortoderm
cortodoxone (INN)
Cortone
Cortril
Cortrophin-Zinc
Cortrosyn
Corvert
Coryphen Codeine
Corzide

cos-coz
cositecan (USAN, INN)
Cosmegen
CosmoFer
Cosopt
Cotazym
cotinine (INN)
Cotrim
cotriptyline (INN)
Coumadin. Redirects to  Warfarin.
coumafos (INN)
coumamycin (INN)
coumazoline (INN)
coumetarol (INN)
Covan
Covera-HS
Coversyl
covirasil (INN)
Cozaar